The Cotton Bowl Classic (also known as the Cotton Bowl) is an American college football bowl game that has been held annually in the Dallas–Fort Worth metroplex since January 1, 1937. The game was originally played at its namesake stadium in Dallas before moving to Cowboys Stadium (now AT&T Stadium) in nearby Arlington in 2010. Since 2014, the game has been sponsored by the Goodyear Tire and Rubber Company and officially known as the Goodyear Cotton Bowl Classic; it was previously sponsored by Mobil (1989–1995) and Southwestern Bell Corporation/SBC Communications/AT&T (1997–2014).

Historically, the game hosted the champion of the Southwest Conference (SWC) against a team invited from elsewhere in the country, frequently a major independent or a runner-up from the Southeastern Conference (SEC). Following the dissolution of the SWC in 1996, the game hosted a runner-up from the Big 12 Conference, facing an SEC team from 1999 to 2014. The Cotton Bowl Classic has served as one of six bowls in the College Football Playoff (CFP) since the 2014 season; it hosted a national semifinal following the 2015, 2018 and 2021 seasons.

The winner of the Cotton Bowl is awarded the Field Scovell Trophy.

History

1930s

The Cotton Bowl Classic was founded in Dallas in 1937 at the Texas State Fair Grounds, when Texas oil executive J. Curtis Sanford financed the first one out of his own pocket. TCU and star quarterback Sammy Baugh took on Marquette, winning 16–6, but the game lost money even though some 17,000 attended. Nonetheless, Sanford persevered, and in 1938 the game made a profit as Rice defeated Byron White's Colorado 28–14 in front of a crowd of 37,000.

Some 40,000 attended the 1939 match between Saint Mary's College of California and Texas Tech, with the Gaels upsetting the undefeated Red Raiders 20–13.

1940s
In 1940, an underdog Clemson team surprised the  Boston College Eagles 6–3, in the first and only appearance at the Cotton Bowl Classic by Tigers coach Frank Howard. Attendance at this game was given as 20,000. Later that year, a group of prominent Dallas citizens took over the staging of the game as the Cotton Bowl Athletic Association. A few months later, the CBAA became an agency of the Southwest Conference. From 1941 to 1994, the SWC's champion hosted the Cotton Bowl Classic.

In 1943, The Texas Longhorns represented the SWC in their first ever bowl game against a highly ranked Georgia Tech team at the time. Prior to the game, sportswriters boasted that Texas did not belong in the same league as Georgia Tech. Texas proved the public wrong by defeating the Yellow Jackets 14–7 in what was mostly a defensive battle. This Cotton Bowl was the first bowl appearance for Texas as the Longhorns would go on to appear in a record 22 Cotton Bowls, the most of any team.

In 1946, Missouri was defeated by Texas, despite the 4th quarter work of freshman fullback Robert (Bob) Lee Clodfelter, who was to mature under Weeb Ewbank at Washington University in St. Louis the next three years.

In 1947 LSU and Arkansas played in front of 38,000 people to a scoreless tie in what would later become known as the "Ice Bowl."  LSU got the better of Arkansas most of the game, but the game truly belonged to the weatherman.

In 1948 Penn State, in a bowl game for the first time in 25 years, played Dallas' SMU to a 13–13 tie. Because none of the Dallas hotels would provide accommodations for the two African-American members of the Penn State team, the Penn State team ended up staying at a Naval Air Station 14 miles from Dallas. This was the first interracial game played at the Cotton Bowl Stadium.

1950s
The 1953 Cotton Bowl would be a rematch of the 1951 bowl game as Texas and Tennessee played for the second time. Texas defensive stars shut out the Vols 16–0 as the Longhorns avenged the previous meeting when Tennessee beat Texas 20–14.

The 1954 Cotton Bowl Classic featured one of the most famous plays in college football history. Rice's Dickey Moegle (last name spelling later changed to "Maegle") began a run around  end from his team's 5-yard line and down the open field. Alabama's Tommy Lewis jumped off the bench and tackled Moegle. The referee, Cliff Shaw, saw what happened and signaled touchdown even though Moegle was "tackled" at the 42-yard line.

The 1957 Classic matched the TCU Horned Frogs against the Jim Brown-led Syracuse Orangemen. Brown rushed for 135 yards, scored three touchdowns and kicked three extra points but a fourth-quarter blocked extra point by TCU's Chico Mendoza proved the margin of victory as TCU won, 28-27. TCU QB Chuck Curtis passed for 174 yards, threw for two touchdowns and rushed for another to lead the Frogs.

1960s
In 1960, Syracuse defeated Texas 23-14 to win the national championship. Syracuse was led by bowl MVP Ernie Davis, who ran for one touchdown, caught a Cotton Bowl Classic record 87-yard touchdown, and intercepted a pass leading to a third touchdown. There was a brawl on the field just before the end of the first half; some said it was because of Texas taking cheap shots at Ernie Davis. The University of Texas president Logan Wilson called for an NCAA hearing on the fight after the game. Syracuse Athletic Director Lew Andreas asserted that no one from his university had accused Texas of dirty play, and attributed those claims to members of the media. The issue was dropped shortly thereafter. In 1961, Davis became the first black athlete to win the Heisman Trophy, but died of leukemia before his pro career could begin.

Duke defeated Arkansas 7–6 in the 1961 game. Duke scored with 2:45 remaining and recovered a fumble on the ensuing series to win the game.

In 1962, Texas would again be selected to play in the Cotton Bowl after winning another SWC Crown. This time the Longhorns faced a highly talented Mississippi Rebels team. The game was a low scoring meeting that came down to the final quarter as Texas won 12–7.

The 1963 game featured the returning Texas Longhorns and the LSU Tigers, who, like Mississippi, were from the SEC.  Lynn Amedee's 23 yard field goal gave the Tigers a 3–0 halftime lead after Texas had missed their own which led to an 80-yard drive. This was the first field goal in the Classic since 1942. Amedee recovered a Longhorn fumble at the 37 early in the third quarter and Jimmy Field scored 5 plays later on a touchdown run.  Buddy Hamic recovered a Longhorn fumble to set up an Amedee field goal 13 plays later as the Tigers shut the Longhorns out.

In 1964, No. 1 Texas completed an undefeated season by defeating No. 2 Navy (led by Heisman Trophy winner and future Dallas Cowboys quarterback Roger Staubach). The game was played six weeks after the assassination of John F. Kennedy (coincidentally, a retired Naval officer) in Dallas. The 1964 game is the second bowl game in college football history to pair the No. 1 and No. 2 teams in the nation (the 1963 Rose Bowl being the first).

In 1965, the Arkansas Razorbacks took an undefeated record (10–0) into the Classic versus a 9–1 Nebraska Cornhuskers team. Although Alabama had been awarded the AP and UPI (Coaches) polls national titles before the bowl games (which was standard at that time), Arkansas still had a chance to claim a share of the national championship with a victory over Nebraska. After a hard-fought defensive battle, the Hogs prevailed 10–7. That victory, coupled with an Alabama loss in the Orange Bowl to Texas (a team Arkansas defeated in Austin, Texas.), gave Arkansas the Grantland Rice Trophy emblematic of the national championship awarded by the Football Writers Association of America (FWAA).

In the 1966 game, Arkansas put its 22-game winning streak at risk playing LSU, who defeated the Razorbacks, 14–7.

The 1967 game was moved to Saturday, December 31, 1966, due to the Dallas Cowboys hosting the NFL Championship Game at the stadium on New Year's Day, a Sunday. The other major bowl games that year—the Rose Bowl, Sugar Bowl, and Orange Bowl—were played on Monday, January 2.

The 1968 game saw SWC champs Texas A&M, led by coach Gene Stallings defeat former A&M head coach Bear Bryant and the Alabama Crimson Tide. Stallings was one of Bryant's "Junction Boys" as well as a former assistant, and would eventually go on to coach the Tide. After the Aggies defeated the Tide 20-16, Bryant embraced Stallings and carried him off the field.

In 1969, Texas was off and running with its new offensive formation, the Wishbone. After dismantling all opponents of the 1968 season, Texas won the SWC crown again and this time faced the Tennessee Volunteers, in what was a lopsided win for Texas with almost 400 rushing yards. Texas won 36–13.

1970s
The 1970 game featured Notre Dame's return to bowl games after a 45-year self-imposed ban. When the Irish made that decision, 9–1 LSU was overlooked for the game, and the Tigers stayed home instead. The Irish, led by quarterback Joe Theismann, faced top-ranked and undefeated Texas. Notre Dame led 17–14 late in the fourth quarter, but the Longhorns scored a late touchdown to clinch a 21–17 victory and an undisputed national championship. The same two teams met the next year, but this time, the Irish ended the Longhorns' 30-game winning streak with a 24–11 victory, denying Texas the Associated Press national championship (the Longhorns had already clinched the regular season  championship in the UPI poll, a pre-bowl poll until the 1974 season; Nebraska won the AP title). Texas and Notre Dame met again in the 1978 game, with the Longhorns again top-ranked, only to see the Irish and quarterback Joe Montana roll to a 38–10 victory. The Irish vaulted from fifth to first in the final polls with the victory.

The 1973 game featured Texas and Alabama once again playing in a bowl game. Alabama led 13–10 going into the 4th quarter when Texas quarterback, Alan Lowry, ran the bootleg to perfection and scrambled 32 yards for the go-ahead touchdown. Again, Texas defeated Alabama and Bear Bryant, 17–13.

The 1976 Cotton Bowl showcased SWC co-Champ Arkansas against SEC stalwart Georgia. The Razorbacks had beaten No. 2 Texas A&M in a blowout to force a tie for the conference crown, and opened the door for Arkansas to stroll to Dallas on New Year's Day. After the Bulldogs jumped out to a 10–0 lead, the Hogs came roaring back, scoring 31 unanswered points, and defeating Georgia, 31–10. Arkansas finished the season 10–2.

The 1977 Cotton Bowl featured SWC Champions Houston Cougars, who were entering the Cotton Bowl for the first time, against the undefeated Maryland Terrapins. Houston won 30-21, handing the Terps their only loss of the year.

The 1979 Cotton Bowl Classic, nicknamed the Chicken Soup Game, featured one of the most historic comebacks in bowl history. Notre Dame trailed Houston 34–12 midway through the fourth quarter. Thanks to a blocked punt and the brilliance of future NFL Hall of Famer Joe Montana, the Irish rallied to win 35–34, their second consecutive Cotton Bowl Classic victory.

1980s
The 1982 game between Texas and Alabama would be the final time that Bear Bryant would face the Longhorns. Having lost to Texas in all meetings prior, Alabama went into the fourth quarter ahead 10–0 and it would appear that the Bear would finally get a win over Texas while at Alabama. But the Longhorns scored their first points with a quarterback draw by Robert Brewer on a 3rd-and-long with 10:38 remaining. On Texas' next possession, Terry Orr scored from eight yards out to cap an 11-play, 80-yard drive to put the Longhorns up 14–10 with 2:05 remaining. Alabama's Joey Jones returned the ensuing kickoff to the Texas 38-yard line, and Tide quarterback Walter Lewis took over with 1:54 left. On the very next play, UT's William Graham picked off a Lewis pass at the one. The Longhorns took a safety to insure better field position and Texas once again stunned Alabama and the Bear with a 14–12 victory.

The 1984 game featured No. 7 Georgia of the SEC against undefeated No. 2 Texas of the SWC. Texas led 9–3 with more than four minutes to play in a battle of field goals between Georgia's Kevin Butler and Texas' Jeff Ward. A Chip Andrews (Georgia) punt was muffed by Texas defensive back Craig Curry late in the fourth quarter, then Georgia quarterback John Lastinger ran 17 yards for a touchdown with 3:22 left to play to capture a 10–9 victory, costing the Longhorns a possible national title.

The 1989 game between UCLA and Arkansas was highly publicized in the Dallas area because Bruin quarterback Troy Aikman was expected to be the top pick in the 1989 NFL Draft; the first pick was held by the Dallas Cowboys. Much was made of Cowboys longtime head coach Tom Landry watching Aikman practice at Texas Stadium, UCLA's practice facility for game preparation. Landry never got to draft Aikman, because he was fired the next month, but his successor, Jimmy Johnson, did. UCLA and Aikman won, 17–3.

The Cotton Bowl Classic has seen its share of great quarterbacks. Sammy Baugh, Davey O'Brien, Babe Parilli, Bobby Layne, Norm Van Brocklin, Y. A. Tittle, Bart Starr, Roger Staubach, Ken Stabler, Joe Theismann, Joe Montana, Dan Marino, Doug Flutie, Troy Aikman, and Eli Manning all have played in the game.

Three of the four Heisman Trophy winners from the 1984–87 seasons finished their college career in the Cotton Bowl Classic: Doug Flutie for Boston College in January 1985, Bo Jackson of Auburn in 1986, and Tim Brown of Notre Dame in 1988.

Brown and fellow Heisman winner Davey O'Brien, who played in the 1937 Cotton Bowl, both attended nearby Woodrow Wilson High School in the Lakewood area. "Woodrow" became the first high school ever to produce two Heisman winners.

1990s
For 53 years, the SWC champion played as the home team in the Cotton Bowl Classic, a tie-in which continued through the 1994 season. Until the mid-1980s, the contest was almost universally counted as a major New Year's Day bowl. However, by the late 1980s, the Cotton Bowl Classic's prestige had fallen significantly. During the 1980s, many SWC teams were left ineligible for postseason play due to NCAA probations for rule violations. Also, the conference's quality of play suffered a marked decline. The SWC champion lost the last seven times in which it received an automatic bid to the game, and the last national champion for almost four decades to play in the Cotton Bowl Classic was Notre Dame in 1977 (eventual national champions Alabama and Clemson would later play in the Cotton Bowl after the 2015 and 2018 seasons, respectively). Finally, the Cotton Bowl Classic was played outdoors during cold weather on occasion (most notably the 1979 game).

Meanwhile, the Fiesta Bowl, unhindered by conference tie-ins and played in generally warm weather, propelled itself to major-bowl status by attracting national championship contenders, most notably with its January 1987 matchup between Penn State and Miami. In the minds of many fans, the Fiesta replaced the Cotton as a major bowl. Despite this, the Cotton Bowl Classic still retained enough prestige that it was included as one of the top bowls in the Bowl Coalition when it was formed in 1992. However, in 1995, the new Bowl Alliance (the predecessor of the BCS) chose to include the Fiesta over the Cotton in its rotation. While it was still capable of landing Top 10 teams, it was no longer in a position to decide the national championship. In 18 of the 21 seasons since 1995, the Cotton Bowl has featured two ranked opponents. In the other three seasons, one of the teams was ranked (2002, 2003, and 2010).

In 1995, the SWC gave up control of the Cotton Bowl Classic as part of its planned dissolution after the season. From 1999 to 2014, the Cotton Bowl Classic had the second pick from the Big 12 after the Bowl Alliance and its successor, the Bowl Championship Series–usually the championship game loser or a division runner-up.

From 1996 to 1998, the other participant was either the champion of the Western Athletic Conference or the runner-up of the Pac-10 Conference. In 1996, the No. 5 BYU Cougars joined Notre Dame as the only programs outside of a major conference to play in the Cotton Bowl in the modern era, defeating the Kansas State Wildcats 19–15, winning an NCAA record 14th game, and finishing the season ranked fifth in the country with a 14–1 record.

In 1999, the Cotton Bowl arranged for a team from the Southeastern Conference to be the Big 12 opponent, and Southwestern Bell (now AT&T) began sponsoring the event. More often than not, the SEC representative was the runner-up from the West Division. However, Tennessee appeared in 2001 and 2005, and Missouri appeared in 2014.

2000s
Through 2008, the Cotton Bowl Classic continued to be played on New Year's Day (except in 2004 and 2006, when the game was moved to January 2) and was usually the second game of the day to kick off, generally following the Outback Bowl.

This decade was kicked off in grand fashion, as two former Southwest Conference rivals faced off in the 2000 Classic. The Arkansas Razorbacks, now a member of the SEC, and Texas Longhorns, now a member of the Big XII faced off in the first college football game of the last year of the 20th Century. After a lackluster first half ended with the game tied 3–3, the Razorbacks opened things up, led by Offensive MVP running back Cedric Cobbs. Arkansas beat their former hated rival, 27–6, holding the Longhorns to negative yards rushing, and sacking the Texas QB a bowl-record 8 times.

The 2003 Cotton Bowl Classic saw a rematch between the Texas Longhorns and the LSU Tigers. LSU led at the half 17–7 however Roy Williams of Texas had a tremendous breakout in the second half to lead Texas to victory over the Tigers, 35–20.
The 2004 Cotton Bowl Classic saw the return of the Mississippi Rebels, whose last appearance in the Cotton Bowl Classic was a 12–7 loss to Texas in 1962. The 2004 Cotton Bowl Classic would also be New York Giants quarterback Eli Manning's last college football game. Manning led his team to beat Oklahoma State 31–28.

The 2007 Cotton Bowl Classic was between Auburn Tigers and the Nebraska Cornhuskers; Auburn won 17–14.

In the 2008 Cotton Bowl Classic, Missouri's running back Tony Temple broke the bowl game rushing record by gaining 281 yards on 24 carries. (The record was previously held by Rice's Dickey Maegle, who had rushed for 265 yards.) Missouri beat Arkansas 38–7.

In April 2008, Cotton Bowl Classic officials announced that in 2009 and 2010 the game would be moved from its traditional start time of 10 a.m. CST on January 1 to 1 p.m. CST on January 2.

In the final Cotton Bowl Classic game to be held in the Cotton Bowl stadium, the 8–4, No. 20 Ole Miss Rebels defeated the 11–1, No. 7 Texas Tech Red Raiders, 47–34. Tech quarterback Graham Harrell broke the NCAA record in this game for most touchdown passes thrown by anyone in Cotton Bowl Classic history.

2010s
In 2010, the Cotton Bowl Classic moved to the new Cowboys Stadium (now AT&T Stadium) in Arlington, as part of a bid by bowl officials to make it part of the BCS in 2011. The Cotton Bowl had recently been remodeled and expanded to over 92,000 seats as part of a long-term drive to regain major status for the bowl game. However, Dallas' frequently cold January weather had been a longstanding concern, and was thought to have hampered any prospect of upgrading the game to the BCS. In contrast, the new stadium would offer top amenities and a retractable roof. A new four-year agreement between the BCS and ESPN had forestalled any possibility of the Cotton Bowl Classic joining the BCS until 2015 at the earliest. Later findings that the Fiesta Bowl reimbursed employees more than $46,000 for political contributions could have opened the door for the Cotton Bowl to replace the Fiesta in the BCS bowl rotation; however, the Fiesta Bowl did not lose its BCS rotation.

In the 2010 Cotton Bowl Classic played between the Oklahoma State Cowboys and the Ole Miss Rebels at the new Cowboys Stadium, the Rebels shut down the high scoring Cowboys offense to win the 74th annual Cotton Bowl Classic 21–7.

In 2010, the Cotton Bowl celebrated its 75th Anniversary with a new logo dedicated to the year-long celebration. Texas A&M played Louisiana State University in the 2011 AT&T Cotton Bowl Classic on January 7, 2011. LSU would beat Texas A&M 41–24. This was the first Cotton Bowl Classic to be played in prime time, as well as the latest calendar date for the game.

In the 2012 match-up, the Arkansas Razorbacks defeated the  Kansas State Wildcats 29–16. It was a BCS-worthy game, featuring two Top 10 teams. The game was highlighted by Razorback Joe Adams punt return of 51 yards for a touchdown in the second quarter, to give Arkansas early command. It was the first punt returned for a touchdown in the Cotton Bowl Classic since former Razorback Lance Alworth did it in 1961. After the Hogs posted 19 unanswered points, Kansas State responded with 16 consecutive points of their own in the second and third quarters. But the Razorbacks pulled away late in the third quarter and early fourth quarter, led by quarterback Tyler Wilson, the game's offensive MVP. Arkansas improved to 11–2 for the 2011 season, and finished ranked No. 5, while K-State fell to 10–3.

In 2013, the No. 10 Texas A&M Aggies defeated the No. 12 Oklahoma Sooners 41–13 to win the Cotton Bowl Classic and to finish the season with an 11–2 record. Johnny Manziel rushed for 229 yards during the game, a Cotton Bowl record, rushing for two touchdowns and throwing for two more. Though the halftime score was 14–13 Texas A&M, the Aggies went on to score 27 unanswered second half points to win the game.

The Cotton Bowl Classic returned to "major" bowl status in the 2014 season in conjunction with the first year of the new College Football Playoff. It will host a national semifinal once every three years (in the 2015, 2018, 2021, 2024 seasons), and in other years will host two at-large teams that did not get selected to the four-team playoff. As part of this move, television rights will switch to ESPN, which will also televise the other games in the playoff system. The 2014 game, the first Cotton Bowl to be universally recognized as a "major" bowl in almost two decades, featured the No. 9 Missouri Tigers of the Southeastern Conference and the No. 13 Oklahoma State Cowboys of the Big 12 Conference. The Tigers beat the Cowboys by a score of 41–31 to claim the school's second-ever Cotton Bowl Classic championship and set a new AT&T Stadium record with 24 points in the fourth quarter. The 2017 game saw the No. 15 Western Michigan Broncos of the Mid-American Conference and the No. 9 Wisconsin Badgers of the Big Ten Conference. The Badgers beat the Broncos, 16-24. Up until that point, Western Michigan was undefeated, 13-0 overall, 8-0 in the MAC. They also became the first team in the MAC to participate in the Cotton Bowl Classic.

Sponsorship
From 1989 until 1995, the game was sponsored by Mobil Oil and known as the Mobil Cotton Bowl Classic. From 1996 to 2013, the game was sponsored by Southwestern Bell Corporation; however, it went through several name changes, first in 2000 when the firm adopted a standardized "SBC" branding reflecting its name it adopted in 1995, SBC Communications, and since 2006, after their acquisition of AT&T Corporation, and its subsequent name change to AT&T Inc., as the AT&T Cotton Bowl Classic.

On October 15, 2014, ESPN.com reported that AT&T would no longer sponsor the Cotton Bowl since it already holds the naming rights to the stadium in which it is played. On November 7, 2014, it was announced that Goodyear would become the new sponsor of the game, now known for sponsorship reasons as the Goodyear Cotton Bowl Classic.

Venues

Cotton Bowl

The Cotton Bowl is a stadium which opened in 1930 and became known as "The House That Doak Built" due to the immense crowds that former SMU running back Doak Walker drew to the stadium during his college career in the late 1940s. Originally known as the Fair Park Bowl, it is located in Fair Park, site of the State Fair of Texas. The Cotton Bowl Classic called its namesake home since the bowl's inception in 1937 until the 2010 game. The NFL's Dallas Cowboys called the Cotton Bowl home for 11 years, from the team's formation in 1960 until 1971, when the Cowboys moved to Texas Stadium.
Although not the first established bowl game, the Cotton Bowl is a play on the phrase "cotton boll."   Texas is the leading producer of cotton in the United States.

AT&T Stadium

AT&T Stadium, formerly Cowboys Stadium, is a domed stadium with a retractable roof in Arlington, Texas. After failed negotiations to return the Cowboys to the Cotton Bowl, Jerry Jones along with the city of Arlington, Texas funded the stadium at a cost of $1.15 billion. It was completed on May 29, 2009 and seats 80,000, but is expandable to seat up to 100,000. AT&T Stadium is the largest domed stadium in the world.

A highlight of AT&T Stadium is its center-hung high-definition television screen, the second largest in the world. The ,  scoreboard surpasses the  screen that opened in 2009 at the renovated Kauffman Stadium in Kansas City, Missouri.

Game results
All rankings are taken from the AP Poll prior to the game being played.

Source:
 Denotes College Football Playoff semifinal game

Future games

 denotes game is a College Football Playoff semifinal

Most Valuable Player award

Source:

Most appearances
Updated through the January 2023 edition (87 games, 174 total appearances).

Teams with multiple appearances

Teams with a single appearance
Won (8): BYU, Duke, Florida State, Kentucky, Miami (FL), Saint Mary's (CA), Tulane, Wisconsin

Lost (10): Cincinnati, Florida, Fordham, Marquette, Maryland, Memphis, Mississippi State, North Carolina, Pittsburgh, Western Michigan

Tied (2): Air Force, Randolph Field

 Oklahoma State's record includes one appearance when the school was known as Oklahoma A&M.
 Each of the teams who were members of the Southwest Conference sometime between 1936 and 1995 have appeared in at least one Cotton Bowl.
 South Carolina and Vanderbilt are the only members of the SEC that have not played in the Cotton Bowl.
 Iowa State, Kansas and West Virginia are the only members of the Big 8 or Big 12 that have not played in the Cotton Bowl. In addition, former Big 12 members Colorado, Missouri, Nebraska, and Texas A&M have all played in multiple Cotton Bowls.
 Michigan State, Ohio State, Penn State (also played in the Cotton Bowl prior to being in the Big Ten), and Wisconsin are the only Big Ten teams to have participated in the Cotton Bowl (Maryland and Nebraska participated prior to joining the conference).  Prior to 2014, only one Big Ten team had appeared in the Cotton Bowl.
 Texas A&M, Texas Tech and Missouri  played in the Cotton Bowl as a member of three different conferences.  A&M played as the Southwest Conference, the Big 12, and the SEC, Tech played as part of the Border Conference, SWC and Big 12, and Missouri played as part of the Big 8, Big 12 and SEC.

Appearances by conference
Updated through the January 2023 edition (87 games, 174 total appearances).

 Games marked with an superscript D were played in December.
 Records reflect conference affiliations at the time each game was played.
 Conferences that are defunct or no longer active in FBS are marked in italics.
 The Big Eight's record includes one game when the conference was known as the Big Six.
 The Pac-12's record includes four games when the conference was known as the Pac-10. It does not include the one appearance made by current Pac-12 member Oregon as a member of the Pacific Coast Conference. Although the Pac-12 considers the PCC to be part of its own history, the two leagues were established under separate charters.

Game records

Note: for ties, the most recent year is shown.

Broadcasting
The first televised edition of the Cotton Bowl Classic was in 1953 by NBC. NBC provided coverage of the game from 1952 to 1957. In 1958, CBS began a streak of broadcasts of the event through 1992. NBC televised the game from 1993 to 1995. The Cotton Bowl returned to CBS in 1996 and remained for three years. From 1999 to 2014, the Cotton Bowl Classic was televised by Fox. As part of the College Football Playoff rotation, ESPN took over rights to the game beginning in 2015.

In 2013, Fox Deportes televised the game nationally for the first time in Spanish. The game returned to Fox Deportes in 2014. In 2015, ESPN Deportes becomes the new Spanish-language television home of the game.

The game is also broadcast nationally on radio by ESPN Radio and ESPN Deportes Radio. ESPN Radio succeeded former longtime Cotton Bowl carrier Westwood One in 2013. 2013 marked the first Spanish radio broadcast of the game.

See also

List of college bowl games
Comerica Bank New Year's Parade, also known as the "Cotton Bowl Parade"

References

External links

 
Annual sporting events in the United States
College football bowls
American football competitions in Texas
Recurring sporting events established in 1937
1937 establishments in Texas
Goodyear Tire and Rubber Company
College football in Texas